The Movie and Television Review and Classification Board  (abbreviated as MTRCB) is a Philippine government agency under the Office of the President of the Philippines that is responsible for the classification and review of television programs, motion pictures and home videos.

Unlike other organizations worldwide (such as the BBFC), the Board does not rate video games. Thus, both the ESRB system used in the United States, and IARC system are the de facto rating systems used in the Philippines, although there have been attempts at formulating an independent local rating system. Certain video game vendors ask for a valid ID or any other verification to be able to buy M- and AO-rated games. The Board also does not rate literature.

The Movie and Television Review and Classification Board also serves as a de facto censorship body.

History
The MTRCB was initially created as the Board of Censors for Motion Pictures by virtue of Republic Act 3060 signed by President Carlos P. Garcia in 1961 and directly subordinate to the Office of the President. Over the years, its name and powers were changed and expanded by succeeding administrations. In 1980, as part of Executive Order No. 585 issued by President Ferdinand Marcos during the Martial Law , the Board was reconstituted to include senior officials of the Ministry of Justice, the Ministry of Education and Culture, the Ministry of National Defense, the Ministry of Public Information and the National Intelligence and Security Authority (NISA). To reflect the rising influence of television in the Philippines, the agency was renamed into the Board of Review for Motion Pictures and Television by virtue of Executive Order No. 745 issued by Marcos in 1981. In 1983, its scope was expanded to include live entertainment, and as such the Board was renamed by Marcos into the Board of Review for Motion Pictures, Television and Live Entertainment by virtue of Executive Order No. 868. Controversially, it was also given the power to bar any film deemed "subversive" in content and "undermining faith in the government" 

Ultimately, the economic and political crisis of the 1980s led the Marcos regime to abolish the board and replace it with the current Movie and Television Review and Classification Board in 1985 by virtue of Presidential Decree No. 1986. After the fall of the Marcos dictatorship in 1986, the Board was reconstituted to remove defense and security officials and reduce its composition to civilian personnel, though the ban on subversive material remains. In the 1990s, an Appeals Committee was created to allow appeal and reversals of the MTRCB's decisions.

The Board
The chairman, the vice-chairman and the other 30 Board members compose the Board. Each one holds office for a term of one year but may be reappointed after the expiration of their term. Diorella Maria Sotto-Antonio is the current board chairman appointed since July 7, 2022.

List of board chairpersons

Classification ratings

Movies

While the MTRCB primarily rates most films released in commercial cinemas, independent and art-house films released in the Philippines are not rated by the MTRCB themselves and instead through the Film Development Council of the Philippines and the Film Cultural Exchange Program (FCEP), the films are rated through the FDCP rating system pursuant to the agreed-upon guidelines by the FDCP and the MTRCB.

Summary

The R-13, R-16, and R-18 ratings are legally restricted. All cinemas are required to check the ages of all patrons who wish to view such films in a cinema. Allowing underage viewers to watch such films is a violation of Philippine law and can be met with fines or other sanctions. The public exhibition of an "X-rated" film in the Philippines is a serious criminal offense.

General Audience ("G")
 G  Viewers of all ages are admitted. A "G" classification advises parents or supervising adults that the film is suitable for all audiences.

A film classified as "G" shall, in the judgment of the Board, meet the following criteria:
 Theme – The film should not contain violence, threat, abuse, horror, or other themes that may cause fear or disturbance to a young child's mind.
 Language – The film may contain dialogue or other word representations beyond courteous language, but menacing, profane, offensive, and sexually-suggestive language or gestures shall not be allowed.
 Nudity – The film may contain occasional, as well as natural non-sexual nudity.
 Sex – The film cannot contain and depict sexual activity.
 Violence – The depiction of any violence must be mild, brief, infrequent, and unlikely to cause undue anxiety or fear to young children.
 Horror – The depiction of horror and frightening scenes should be mild, brief, infrequent, and unlikely to cause undue anxiety or fear to young children.
 Drugs – There shall be no depiction of, or reference to, prohibited drugs or their use.

Parental Guidance ("PG")
 PG  Viewers below 13 years old should be accompanied by a parent or supervising adult. A "PG" classification advises parents or supervising adults that the film may contain any of the elements whose treatment is suitable for children below 13 years of age.

A film classified as "PG" shall, in the judgment of the Board, meet the following criteria:
 Theme – The film may contain themes that require parental supervision and guidance, but should not promote any dangerous, violent, discriminatory, or otherwise offensive behavior or attitude.
 Language – The film may contain mild and infrequent swear words and menacing language. Offensive, menacing, threatening language and references to sex shall always be suitable for viewers who are below 13 years of age. Infrequent, brief and justifiable sexually-suggestive language may be allowed.
 Nudity – The film may contain occasional, as well as natural non-sexual nudity.
 Sex – The depiction of non-graphic sexual activity may be allowed, but it should be discreet, infrequent, and not prolonged.
 Violence – The depiction of non-gratuitous violence and suffering should be minimal, and without graphic detail;.
 Horror – The depiction of brief and infrequent horror and frightening scenes shall be allowed.
 Drugs – There shall be no depiction of, or reference to, prohibited drugs or substances and their use.

Restricted 13 ("R-13")
 R-13  Only viewers who are 13 years old and above can be admitted. An "R-13" classification advises parents, supervising adults, or the would-be viewers themselves, that the film may contain any of the elements that may not be suitable for children below 13 years of age.

A film classified as "R-13" must, in the judgment of the Board, meet the following criteria:
 Theme – The film may contain mature themes but is suitable for teenagers above 13 years of age, and shall not gratuitously promote or encourage any dangerous, violent, discriminatory, or otherwise offensive behavior or attitude.
 Language – The film may contain moderate swear words and menacing language consistent with the context of the scene in which they are employed. The use of infrequent and non-vulgar strong swear words or sexually-derived or suggestive expletives and expressions as well as the use of swear words and expletives shall be allowed. The use of sexually-oriented or suggestive language and other references to sex shall always be suitable for viewers who are at least 13 years of age.
 Nudity – The film may contain brief, discreet and justifiable occasional, natural and sexually-oriented nudity.
 Sex – Discreet, infrequent, brief, non-graphic and justifiable sexual activity may be depicted.
 Violence – Infrequent, non-gratuitous, non-graphic and justifiable violence may be allowed.
 Horror – The justifiable depiction of horror, frightening scenes, and occasional gore are allowed.
 Drugs – The movie shall not in any case promote, condone, justify and/or encourage drug use.

Restricted–16 ("R-16")
 R-16  Only viewers who are 16 years old and above can be admitted. An "R-16" classification advises parents and supervising adults that the film may contain any of the elements that may not be suitable for children below 16 years of age.

A film classified as "R-16" must, in the judgment of the Board, meet the following criteria:
 Theme – There are no restrictions on themes; provided that the treatment is appropriate for viewers who are at least 16 years of age.
 Language – The film may use any kind of language.
 Nudity – The film may contain discreet, non-gratuitous and justifiable natural and sexually-oriented nudity.
 Sex – Non-graphic, non-gratuitous and justifiable sexual activity may be depicted.
 Violence – Non-gratuitous and justifiable violence and gore may be allowed.
 Horror – The non-gratuitous and justifiable depiction of horror, frightening scenes, and gore are allowed.
 Drugs – The non-gratuitous and justifiable depiction of drugs or their use may be allowed. The movie shall not in any case promote, condone, and encourage drug use.

Restricted-18 ("R-18")
 R-18  Only viewers who are 18 years old and above can be admitted. An "R-18" classification advises viewers, parents, and supervising adults that the film may contain any of the elements that may not be suitable for children below 18 years of age. SM Cinema does not show films in their cinemas classified by this rating.

Adults should be free, within the law, to choose what they want to watch. An "R-18" rating does not mean that the film is "obscene", "offensive", or "pornographic," as these terms are defined by law.

A film classified as "R-18" must, in the judgment of the Board, meet the following criteria:
 Theme – There are no restrictions on themes and their treatment.
 Language – The film may use any kind of justifiable language.
 Nudity – The film may contain non-gratuitous and justifiable sexually-oriented nudity.
 Sex – The realistic depiction of non-gratuitous and justifiable sexual activity may be allowed.
 Violence – There are no restrictions on the depiction of non-gratuitous and justifiable violence.
 Horror – The justifiable depiction of horror, frightening scenes, and gore are allowed.
 Drugs – The justifiable depiction of drugs or their use may be allowed. In no case, however, should the use of drugs be promoted, condoned, justified and/or encouraged.

Not for Public Exhibition ("X")
 X  "X-rated" films have been deemed by the board to be unsuitable for public exhibition.

A film shall be disapproved for public viewing if, in the judgment of the Board:
 The average person, applying contemporary community standards and values, would find that the dominant theme of the work, taken as a whole appeals solely to the prurient interest and satisfies only the craving for gratuitous sex and/or violence.
 The film depicts in a patently lewd, offensive, or demeaning manner, excretory functions and sexual conduct such as sexual intercourse, masturbation and exhibition of the genitals.
 The film clearly constitutes an attack against any race, creed, or religion.
 The film condones or encourages abuse and exploitation against women and/or children.
 The film promotes or endorses the use of illegal drugs and substances.
 The film tends to undermine the faith and confidence of the people in their government and/or duly-constituted authorities.
 The film glorifies criminals or condones crimes.
 The film may constitute contempt of court or of a quasi-judicial tribunal, or may pertain to matters which are subjudicial in nature.

Use of movie ratings in television
Celestial Movies Pinoy uses an advisory for these movie ratings before showing of the film in lieu of television ratings.

Television

The MTRCB has implemented a television content rating system since November 1, 1995. Historically, there were only two television ratings used (see the table below). These ratings consisted of a plain text digital on-screen graphic (or pictogram) appearing on the corner of the screen during a program's run time.

Summary

On October 6, 2011, in order to encourage parents to supervise and be responsible with their children in watching television, the rating system was reformatted, with one additional rating added.

The ratings notice are always played before the start or midway of the show. The rating voice-overs are usually in Filipino, but predominantly English-language stations have the ratings notice spoken in English (within abroad, GMA Pinoy TV, GMA Life TV, GMA News TV International, Kapatid Channel, AksyonTV International, The Filipino Channel, Cinema One and ANC; only spoken in English). Ratings notices were previously broadcast in a 4:3 aspect ratio, but has since been broadcast in a 16:9 widescreen format.

The green 'G', blue 'PG' and red 'SPG' graphic/DOG below are usually seen on the lower right or upper left corner of the screen during the entire show. All programs shown by the television channels are reviewed and classified by the said board. The board may suspend, reject or cancel programs, but cannot revoke broadcast licenses.

General Patronage ("G")

 G  Suitable for all ages. Material for television, which in the judgment of the Board does not contain anything unsuitable for children.

It appears in most home shopping blocks, children's programming, documentaries, concert specials, talent reality shows and educational programming, as well as some religious programming.

A pictogram advisory accompanied by full-screen written verbal advisory to the effect that the program is classified as "General Patronage" shall be broadcast for at least 10 seconds immediately before the opening credits of the particular television material classified as such.

Parental Guidance / Patnubay at Gabay ("PG")

 PG  Parental guidance suggested. Material for television, which, in the judgment of the Board, may contain some adult material that may be permissible for children to watch but only under the guidance and supervision of a parent or adult.

The television program classified as "PG" must, in the judgment of the Board, meet the following criteria:
 Theme – More serious issues may be tackled but the treatment must be suitable to children below 13 years old.
 Language – Very mild swear words only shall be allowed. Use of a strong expletive in a sexual context or sexually-based expletives shall not be allowed. Neither shall prolonged and/or successive use of expletives be allowed.
 Nudity – Occasional natural, non-sexual nudity, is permissible.
 Sex – Graphic depiction of sexual activity shall not be permitted. Sexual activity may be implied but with no details shown.
 Violence – There should be no glamorization of weapons and crimes. No detail of fighting or other dangerous techniques. No detail or prolonged showing of violence or suffering.
 Horror – Scary sequences must be mild and brief.
 Drugs – There may only be implied depiction of prohibited drugs and/or substances or their use provided it does not condone, encourage or glamorize drug and/or substance use and it should be necessary to the theme and characterization.

A pictogram advisory accompanied by full-screen written and verbal advisory to the effect that the program is classified as "Parental Guidance" shall be broadcast for at least 10 seconds immediately before the opening credits of the particular television material classified as such. GMA Network's Wowowin airs two PG DOGs, the second one being the cue for regional stations to join in the Manila feed.

Strong Parental Guidance / Striktong Patnubay at Gabay ("SPG")
 

 SPG  Stronger and more vigilant parental guidance is suggested. Programs classified as "SPG" may contain more serious topics and themes, which may not be advisable for children to watch except under the very vigilant guidance and presence of a parent or an adult.

Television programs classified as "SPG" must still fall within the parameters of the existing Parental Guidance classification rating. However, to merit the issuance of an "SPG" rating, the gravity of the material must, in the judgment of the Board, be leaning towards the maximum allowable for Parental Guidance rating. In determining the proper classification rating, the Board shall consider the purpose, genre, and time slot of the program as well as the treatment and depiction of attendant factors such as, but not limited to: Theme (Tema), Language (Lenggwahe), Violence (Karahasan), Sex (Sekswal), Horror (Horror) and Drugs (Droga).

In the exercise of its judgment, the Board shall take due consideration of balancing the interest of the State to protect the welfare of the youth with the interest of the broadcast networks to freedom of expression.

A pictogram advisory accompanied by a full-screen written advisory with voice over to the effect that the program is classified as "Strong Parental Guidance" shall be broadcast for at least 20 seconds, immediately before the opening credits and midway in the full airing of the particular television material classified as such. The full-screen advisory shall specifically declare the content descriptors pertinent to the program being shown, such as but not limited to: Theme (Tema), Language (Lenggwahe), Violence (Karahasan), Sex (Sekswal), Horror and Drugs (Droga).

The SPG rating was implemented on February 9, 2012.

Disapproved for Airing on Television ("X")
Any television program that does not conform to the "G", "PG", and "SPG" classification shall be unfit for television broadcast if, in the judgment of the Board applying contemporary Filipino cultural values as standard, it is objectionable for being immoral, indecent, contrary to law and/or good customs, injurious to the prestige of the Republic of the Philippines or its people, or with a dangerous tendency to encourage the commission of violence, or of a wrong, or crime, such as but not limited to:
 The average person, applying contemporary community standards and values, would find that the dominant theme of the work, taken as a whole appeals solely to the prurient interest and satisfies only the craving for gratuitous sex and/or violence.
 The work depicts in a patently lewd, offensive, or demeaning manner, excretory functions, and sexual conduct such as sexual intercourse, masturbation and exhibition of the genitals.
 The work clearly constitutes an attack against any race, creed or religion.
 The work condones or encourages abuse and exploitation against women and/or children.
 The work promotes or endorses the use of illegal drugs and substances.
 The work tends to undermine the faith and confidence of the people in their government and/or duly constituted authorities.
 The work glorifies criminals or condones crimes.
 The work is libelous or defamatory to the good name and reputation of any person, whether living or dead.
 The work may constitute contempt of court of a quasi-judicial tribunal, or may pertain to matters, which are subjudicial in nature.

Exemptions of classification ratings in television
National and local newscasts are exempted from the ratings system (except in the case of selected news stories, such as in ABS-CBN's TV Patrol, which uses an SPG graphic for stories with sensitive or graphic content). Some regional news programs and some CNN Philippines newscasts air a PG advisory before the show, which may violate the rules. These circumstances, however, do not affect the program itself. TV5's Aksyon sa Tanghali, on the other hand, was given a Strong Parental Guidance rating in April 2018 due to its public service segments profane nature. The rating also includes the news segments of the said edition.

IBC 13 does not use either the green 'G', blue 'PG', or red 'SPG' graphics on selected programs and documentaries produced by the government-controlled Presidential Communications Group (Philippines) (PCOO), considering that they are information-based materials. DepEd TV and DepEd ALS also do not use the three aforementioned rating graphics considering that they are educational content.

Home videos

The Optical Media Board formerly governed censorship for home video releases; this has since been managed by the Movie and Television Review and Classification Board.

Before 2015, unlike the theatrical ratings, only three are applied to video releases and printed on labels: General Audience (G) for films previously rated G in cinemas, Parental Guidance (PG) for most PG and some R-13 or R-16 titles (with cuts for the R-ratings), and Restricted For Adults (R) for some R-13, many R-16, and most R-18 titles [without cuts for R-16 and R-18, including films released unrated or with adults-only rating equivalents (e.g. R, 18, M18, NC-17, Category III, and R21) outside the Philippines].

Since 2015, the theatrical ratings were applied as home video ratings, replacing the previous system.

In addition to issuing parental ratings for home video content, routine inspections are also conducted at public transport terminals where passenger buses equipped with onboard entertainment systems can be found, to ensure that the films in question are approved by both agencies for public exhibition and are free of inappropriate content.

Radio

The Kapisanan ng mga Brodkaster ng Pilipinas (KBP; English: Association of Broadcasters of the Philippines), an association unrelated to the government, governs censorship on radio, although it can only reprimand its own members using the required disciplinary action. Some radio stations have their own PG and SPG advisory before the start of the program, should it contain mature themes.

Internet
Although the board itself does not govern nor does it censor TV shows and movies online, video streaming services such as VIU, Discovery+, iflix, Netflix, and HBO Go make use of their own content rating systems to ensure whether content is or isn't family-friendly.

On September 3, 2020, it was reported that MTRCB wanted to seek the "regulation" of video content that is provided by streaming platforms such as Netflix. According to Atty. Jonathan Presquito, the MTRCB legal affairs division chief, there is a necessity proceed with the regulation, especially because several video content are unrated. However, the move was strongly criticized by several groups and people, noting that the MTRCB has become a tool of censorship. Senator Franklin Drilon said that the move was "very impractical".

Controversies

Despite touting itself as promoting Filipino values and "intelligent viewing", the board has drawn criticism from filmmakers and special interest groups for its vested interest in the film and television industries, de facto censorship, stifling of creative freedoms on the grounds of family-friendliness, and allegations of inaccuracy in film and television ratings.

Critics contend that the board has not rated certain media, particularly international superhero, action and fantasy films, such as Michael Bay's Transformers and the Harry Potter series (based on the novels by J.K. Rowling), along with locally produced romantic comedies, harshly for violent or sexual themes, noting the arbitrary and biased classification based on board members' opinions on certain films for mature audiences yet overlooking certain scenes or themes that would be given a higher rating elsewhere.

Sanctions on content
Aside from administering parental ratings for movies and shows, the MTRCB also reserves the right to sanction a certain program (or suspend a cable channel) depending on the gravity of the violation as a means of disciplinary action. The following cases involve domestic and international content suspensions, probations, and even self-regulations due to the following issues with the content or cast.

Minor and government television networks in the Philippines
On August 16, 2004, MTRCB preemptively suspended the showing of the Ang Dating Daan on UNTV for 20 days due to slander and use of offensive and obscene language by its televangelist-host Eli Soriano, as a mean of disciplinary action.
During the 2007 elections, RJTV aired political advertisements for the electoral alliance Genuine Opposition containing offensive and obscene language; they were later pulled off.

Major television networks
On August 6, 1999, Magandang Tanghali Bayan was suspended for 20 days due to inappropriate jokes made by hosts Willie Revillame, Randy Santiago and John Estrada on its segment Calendar Girls.
The controversial suspension of the documentary program I-Witness on GMA Network after it showed "Lukayo", a unique ritual dance from Laguna.
Eda Nolan's wardrobe malfunction in Wowowee, which happened on May 12, 2007, suspended the show for 3 days.
In January 2010, It's Showtime was suspended for 20 days due to guest judge Rosanna Roces making denigrating remarks towards teachers. The Movie and Television Review and Classification Board also directed the filing of criminal charges against Florida Tan, ABS-CBN vice-president for programming, and other officers responsible for the violation. Bong Osorio, head of ABS-CBN's Corporate Communications said that the suspension was not yet final and that they were seeking appeal before the Office of the President. However, the suspension of the variety show lasted for only six days after the Court of Appeals issued a 60-day temporary restraining order against the MTRCB in January 2010, the issuance of the order, and therefore the return of the said show was announced on its replacement Magpasikat.
Willing Willie received a month-long suspension after a child performed a suggestive dance while crying in front of the audience and on its live broadcast. It was placed also under probation, meaning that the show needs daily permits from the MTRCB before airing after the suspension was lifted.
The 20-day suspension of T3: Kapatid, Sagot Kita! responses at actors Raymart Santiago and Claudine Barretto on its live broadcast. Before that, a brawl between their brother, Ramon Tulfo and on the latter couple happened at Ninoy Aquino International Airport Terminal 3. TV5 has questioned the board's decision to suspend the program, stating that the action was heavy-handed and called it an act of censorship, though it was then lifted after a couple of days.
On May 30, 2012, the MTRCB imposed a 3-month suspension to T3: Kapatid Sagot Kita from May 31 to August 31, 2012, without cancellation, regarding to the same issue as above. After the suspension the program will be still under probation, meaning it needs daily permits from the MTRCB before airing until the board is convinced. Chairwoman Grace Poe-Llamanzares stated that MTRCB has the full jurisdiction in the program. However, the suspension was once again lifted on June 21, this time under a 60-day temporary restraining order from the Court of Appeals.
The episode Manika on Maalaala Mo Kaya was slated to be aired on June 2, 2012, but was pulled off after MTRCB granted it rated X regarding the sensitive rape theme. The episode finally aired on June 30, 2012, after it was given a SPG rating for its final televised airing.
On February 8, 2013, the MTRCB imposed a six-month probation period on variety show Party Pilipinas for a lewd dance number involving Lovi Poe and Rocco Nacino. They also ordered GMA Network to apologize publicly.
On December 9, 2013, sketch-comedy show Bubble Gang host Michael V., Rufa Mae Quinto, and GMA Network's executives, were summoned by MTRCB chairman, Eugenio Villareal for a mandatory conference after a sexually sensitive comedy skit called "The Adventures of Susie Lualhati" which aired on November 29, 2013. The skit involved a derogatory and discriminatory portrayal of women.
On October 7, 2015, the daily reality-dating game serial Nasaan Ka Mr. Pastillas? on It's Showtime drew the ire of netizens and the women's group Gabriela. Because of various complaints from online social networking sites, MTRCB summoned the show's executives to discuss the segment. After a thorough investigation, MTRCB imposed "self-regulation" on the said show, with a list of suggestions to improve the segment.
On July 29, 2016, the MTRCB sent summons to the producers, writers, and directors of FPJ's Ang Probinsyano over a scene in the July 25 episode (Girl in the Rain) with "sexually suggestive themes", albeit its SPG rating.
In 2016, executives and producers of romantic dramedy Till I Met You were summoned after complaints came in over various inappropriate scenes and innuendo involving James Reid and Nadine Lustre. Called in were directors Antonette Jadaone and Andoy Ranay, executive producer Arnel Nacario and writer Shugo Praico. MTRCB said matters to be taken up include scenes from the October 25-28 episodes, deeming them inappropriate for public viewing.
On September 6, 2017, the MTRCB summoned drama series Impostora for intimate scenes involving Kris Bernal and Rafael Rosell.
Selected programs on music channel Myx were given an SPG rating to warn the audience that there are offensive, indecent, and obscene language in some music videos.
On July 2, 2018, the replay broadcast of the FIBA Asia qualifying match on TV5 was given an SPG rating after the commercial break to warn the audience that the following scene will contain the infamous basketball brawl between Gilas Pilipinas and Australian Boomers during the basketball match.

International content
 In 1988, the film The Last Temptation of Christ was banned over its alleged anti-religion theme. At the time, the then-head of the MTRCB, Manoling Morato, was known to be an ultraconservative,  having imposed bans on other films deemed as having illicit and graphic content
 In 1994 the MTRCB decided to censor footage from the film Schindler's List depicting sex and nudity, with Chairperson Henrietta Mendez arguing that allowing the film's sex scenes to remain could result in "bigger problems in the future with similar scenes in other films." This led to director Steven Spielberg withdrawing the film from distribution in the Philippines unless it was guaranteed an uncut release. The decision was heavily criticized, with actress and future MTRCB chairperson Armida Siguion Reyna castigating the agency for allowing the release of two films about a real-life murder (The Elsa Castillo Story ... Ang Katotohanan and The Elsa Santos Castillo Story: The Chop Chop Lady) while censoring a "powerful movie, which is inspiring, uplifting and humane," while Senators Raul Roco, Orlando Mercado, and four others sponsored a resolution seeking an inquiry into the agency's regulatory functions, stating that its actions "not only insult the intelligence of the local movie-going public but in effect send a wrong message to the world on Filipino tastes, sensibilities and appreciation for the cinematic arts..." On March 4, 1994, Executive Secretary Teofisto Guingona reversed the agency's decision upon his recommendations to and approval by President Fidel V. Ramos, restoring the film's censored scenes and lowering the film's rating from R-18 to R-15 (despite the latter rating's nonexistence and retitling as R-16).Schindler's List was finally released in its entirety on March 9, 1994.
 In 1995, MTRCB Chair Henrietta Mendez tried to censor a six-second scene featuring pubic hair in the film The Bridges of Madison County. The resulting public uproar led to Mendez' removal by President Ramos. 
TVE Internacional's broadcast was suspended by the MTRCB because of sexual content. It was unclear if the broadcast had been stopped only by SkyCable or all the cable operators nationwide.
The HBO series Entourage was blocked for 3 weeks on Sky Cable because the MTRCB had not yet reviewed it. But on other cable operators, the series was broadcast without any interruption.
In 2019, the MTRCB  banned the film Abominable due to the appearance of the Nine-Dash Line in a scene that contradicted Philippine claims in the South China Sea. 
In November 2021, the MTRCB ordered streaming platform Netflix to remove certain episodes of Pine Gap showing the nine-dash line, deeming it "unfit for public exhibition". It was after the foreign affairs department issued a complaint calling the line "illegal" and a "violation of Philippine sovereignty".
On April 27, 2022, the MTRCB banned the release of the action-adventure film Uncharted due to the appearance of a treasure map featuring "illegal" images of the nine-dash line showing the South China Sea as being part of China's territory, following a request by the Department of Foreign Affairs, stating that the scenes featuring the nine-dash line were "contrary to national interest".

Domestic films
In 1999, the MTRCB ordered a ban on the film Butakal: Sugapa sa Laman, which was loosely based on the Chiong murder case, following an appeal by the Chiong family to President Joseph Estrada and the filing of an injunction that led to the MTRCB reversing its initial permit for release with an R-rating. This led to a protracted legal case after the film's director, Federico Natividad, sued the MTRCB for not returning the film's master copy when it ordered its seizure as part of an administrative review, which was finally resolved in 2007 in favor of Natividad by the Supreme Court, which nevertheless upheld the ban on the film's showing. 
In 2000, MTRCB chairman Armida Siguion-Reyna ordered a ban on the film Live Show due to scenes of exhibitionist nudity and sex. A "second (expanded) review committee" was created and subsequently overruled the decision and voted to give the producer, Regal Films, the permit to exhibit. When the film was finally released in March 2001 after its original name, Toro, which means pay-per-view sex in local slang, was changed, it created a public outcry. After two weeks, President Gloria Macapagal-Arroyo suspended its showing and ordered an appeals committee to screen a review. On March 22, 2001, Nicanor Tiongson, Siguion-Reyna's successor as MTRCB Chair and an anti-conservative film scholar, resigned from his post, saying that he had done so rather than sacrifice his principles and be used "as an instrument for the repression of freedom of expression." He was replaced by Alejandro Roces. On April 3, the Malacañang appeals committee ordered the permanent ban of Live Show from exhibition in theaters.
On August 28, 2006, To Live for the Masses, a documentary film portraying the life of former president Joseph Estrada, was given an X rating by the MTRCB considering it was libelous, incited political rebellion, and undermined people's faith in government.
On March 28, 2017, psychological-thriller film Bliss was originally rated X by the MTRCB due to its depiction of excessive nudity and violence, and masturbation, deeming it unsuitable for public viewing. One of the board members noted the nudity to be "gratuitous". Later on, it was reclassified as R-18.
Cinema One Originals film Metamorphosis was given an X rating by the MTRCB on November 6, 2019, due to some sensitive scenes.
On January 14, 2021, comedy-drama film Paglaki Ko, Gusto Kong Maging Pornstar was given rated X by the MTRCB due to its depiction of excessive nudity and sexual content, and indecent language, deeming it unfit for public viewing. Originally slated for a theatrical release, it was exclusively shown on Viva Films' Vivamax streaming app.

See also

Censorship in the Philippines
List of films banned in the Philippines
Optical Media Board
Television content rating systems
Motion picture rating system
Ad Standards Council of the Philippines
National Telecommunications Commission

References

External links
Official website of the Movie and Television Review and Classification Board
Official website of the Optical Media Board
Official website of the Association of the Philippine Broadcasters

1985 establishments in the Philippines
Censorship in the Philippines
Entertainment rating organizations
Government agencies established in 1985
Government agencies under the Office of the President of the Philippines
Motion picture rating systems
Television in the Philippines